Dominique Vien (born February 10, 1967) is a Canadian politician, who served as Member of the National Assembly for the electoral district of Bellechasse from 2003 to 2007. She was defeated in the 2007 election by Jean Domingue of the Action démocratique du Québec, but was then re-elected in the same district in 2008. She was a member of the Quebec Liberal Party and was the delegate minister for Health and Social Services, previously the Minister for Government Services.

Born in Lévis, Quebec, Vien studied at Université Laval and received a bachelor's degree in communications in 1992. She also studied at the Université du Québec à Trois-Rivières in training, animation and leadership in 2001. From 1992 to 2003, she was a journalist, anchor and host at a radio station in Lac-Etchemin and was a journalist and news anchor at Radio-Canada's CBV-FM in Quebec City from 1999 to 2001.

Vien was elected Member of Parliament for the House of Commons of Canada in the riding of Bellechasse—Les Etchemins—Lévis for the Conservative Party of Canada in the 2021 Canadian federal election.

Electoral record

Federal

Provincial

^ Change is based on redistributed results. Coalition Avenir change is from Action démocratique.

References

External links

 

1967 births
Women government ministers of Canada
Quebec Liberal Party MNAs
Women MNAs in Quebec
Living people
Members of the Executive Council of Quebec
People from Lévis, Quebec
Université Laval alumni
Journalists from Quebec
21st-century Canadian politicians
21st-century Canadian women politicians
Members of the House of Commons of Canada from Quebec
Conservative Party of Canada MPs
Women members of the House of Commons of Canada